"Made of Stone" is a single from The Stone Roses' eponymous debut album.

The band made their debut on national British TV by performing this song on the BBC's The Late Show in September 1989. A minute into the song, the power went out, prompting lead singer Ian Brown to walk off stage, cursing the venue.

The song has seen use in the 1997 American film Heaven or Vegas, and in the PSP 2005 videogame World Tour Soccer.

The B-side of "Made of Stone", "Going Down", references Jackson Pollock's No. 5, 1948. Pollock's paintings influenced the cover art that guitarist John Squire made for the single and the album. The 12" vinyl and CD's B-side "Guernica" is a reversed mix of the title track with John Squire overdubbing guitar parts and Ian Brown singing the phonetically reversed lyrics of "Made of Stone" over the top of the original vocal creating a new droning vocal which produces occasional snippets of words. The vocal effect gives the impression that the "lyrics" of "Guernica" are unrelated to those of "Made of Stone", however, when played in reverse the resemblance can be heard.

Track listings

1989 release
7-inch vinyl (Silvertone ORE 2)
catalogue number in black
 "Made of Stone" (4:11)
 "Going Down" (2:46)

12-inch vinyl (Silvertone ORE T 2)
catalogue number in black
 "Made of Stone" (4:11)
 "Going Down" (2:46)
 "Guernica" (4:23)

1990 reissue
7-inch vinyl (Silvertone ORE 2)
catalogue number in blue
 "Made of Stone" (4:11)
 "Going Down" (2:46)

12-inch vinyl (Silvertone ORE T 2), cassette (Silvertone ORE C 2), CD (Silvertone ORE CD 2)
catalogue number in blue on 12-inch vinyl
 "Made of Stone" (4:11)
 "Going Down" (2:46)
 "Guernica" (4:23)

Certifications

References

External links
The Definitive Stone Roses Discography entry

The Stone Roses songs
1989 singles
1989 songs
Song recordings produced by John Leckie
Songs written by John Squire
Songs written by Ian Brown